The Argues: The Movie is a 2010 Australian comedy film directed by Mark Hembrow and starring David Argue, Patricia Argue, Steven Tandy and Stuart Thompson. The mockumentary film was written by David Argue and Hembrow with improvisation by David Argue, Patricia Argue and Thompson. The film is based on the story of Argue's mother and her romance with the United States and Europe, where she ice skated in many famed shows with her now deceased husband, so David takes her on a sentimental journey revisiting the places she skated around the world while at the same time trying to land himself a Hollywood agent. The film is shot on location in Hollywood, New York City, Florence, Venice, Dubai and Melbourne. The Argues: The Movie'''s original title was Mum and Me''.

References

External links
 
 
 

Australian comedy films
2010 films
2010s English-language films
Films set in the United States
2010 comedy films
2010s Australian films